The Devil in Velvet, first published in 1951, is a detective story by American writer John Dickson Carr.  This novel is both a mystery and a historical novel, with elements of the supernatural.

Plot summary

Cambridge Professor of history Nicholas Fenton, in the England of 1925, makes a bargain with the devil and is sent back in time to Restoration London in 1675 to solve a murder that is about to take place, in the body of Sir Nick Fenton.  Fenton soon finds himself in love with the intended victim, Sir Nick's wife Lydia, and resolves to alter the course of history by preventing her murder.  Fenton's mastery of 20th century swordsmanship makes him a fearsome antagonist in 1675, so much so that he becomes known as "the devil in velvet".  Also involved in the action is a woman who has also sold her soul to the devil and travelled back in time, and Fenton finds himself torn between the two women.  He must not only solve the approaching murder before it happens, but come to terms with Sir Nick's romantic and political entanglements—and even void his deal with the devil.

Reception
Boucher and McComas lauded The Devil In Velvet as an "unbelievably perfect fusion of time travel and diabolism with historical romance and pure detection," listing it among the best imaginative novels of 1951.

References

1951 American novels
Novels by John Dickson Carr
Fiction set in 1675
Fiction set in 1925
Novels set in the 17th century
Novels set in the 1920s
Novels set in London
Novels about time travel